The Ministry of Public Works (MOP;) is the government department of East Timor accountable for public works and related matters.

Functions
The Ministry is responsible for the design, implementation, coordination and evaluation of policy for the following areas:

 public works;
 housing;
 supply, distribution and management of water, sanitation and electricity; and
 execution of urban planning and housing.

Minister
He is assisted by Nicolau Lino Freitas Belo, Deputy Minister of Public Works.

See also 
 List of housing authorities
 List of public works ministries
 Politics of East Timor

References

Footnote

Notes

External links

  – official site

Public Works
East Timor
East Timor
East Timor
East Timor, Public Works
1975 establishments in East Timor

de:Ministerium für den öffentlichen Dienst, Transport und Telekommunikation Osttimors